Leo Des Vignes was a Trinidad and Tobago politician. He served as Member of Parliament for the constituency of Diego Martin Central from January 12, 1987 until his death on August 1, 1990. He had won the seat during the general election of 1986. He also served as a Parliamentary Secretary during that time. He was a member of the National Alliance for Reconstruction.

He was injured during the Jamaat al Muslimeen coup attempt on July 27, 1990, and hospitalised. He died of his injuries on August 1.

References

External links 
 Biography on the website of the Parliament of Trinidad and Tobago

1990 deaths
Members of the House of Representatives (Trinidad and Tobago)
Trinidad and Tobago murder victims
People murdered in Trinidad and Tobago
National Alliance for Reconstruction politicians
20th-century Trinidad and Tobago politicians
Year of birth missing